This article is a list of works by Belgian musician Jonathan Ivo Gilles Vandenbroeck, better known by his stage name Milow.

Albums

Studio albums

Live albums

EPs

Singles

References

External links
 

Discographies of Belgian artists
Pop music discographies